Maxie is a 1985 American fantasy-comedy film directed by Paul Aaron, and starring Glenn Close, Mandy Patinkin, Valerie Curtin, Ruth Gordon and Barnard Hughes. The plot is based on the novel Marion's Wall (1973) by Jack Finney about a woman who is possessed by a very outgoing female ghost — a budding actress from the 1920s — named Maxie, who wants to fulfill her destiny.

Plot
When husband Nick Chaney and his wife Jan, somewhat staid and socially stifled, move into an old apartment house in San Francisco, they uncover a message under layers of wallpaper left by a previous tenant ("Maxie Malone lived here! Read it, and weep!").

The crazy landlady from upstairs is overwhelmed when she sees the message and tells them about an actress, Maxie Malone, who lived there in the 1920s. Maxie was a brash, young party girl who died in a car crash the morning before her big audition for a Hollywood studio.

Her only movie legacy, mere minutes on film, is dug up by Nick who watches it with Jan, who goes to bed right afterwards. Nick is also headed to bed, but he is stopped by a voice which tells him to play the piece again. He thinks that it is Jan at first, but the voice materializes partially in front of him as Maxie and he plays the piece again for her. Then Maxie disappears and Nick goes to bed, dismissing the incident as a psychotic episode.

The next day at work, Nick's boss (who has romantic designs on him) invites him and Jan to a party. Jan is nervous about the high society bash when Nick agrees to attend, but Maxie (who has inserted her soul into Jan's body) behaves rather differently from Jan. "Jan" gets drunk, dances seductively, and sings a vamp version of "Bye Bye Blackbird" draped over the piano, flirting with every male there. Drunk, Maxie and Nick break into an amusement park and make out on a merry-go-round, only to be caught by a policeman, who lets them go after Nick makes up an excuse.

Somehow this otherworldly possession must end, so that Jan can resume her own life. The solution lies in an audition for the lead in a new film production of Cleopatra. Paired with actor Harry Hamlin (as himself), "Jan" dazzles everyone when Maxie takes over the role. A successful actress at last, Maxie moves on in the afterlife. She leaves Jan freer and happier, comfortable in expressing her own sexuality, thanks to sharing Maxie's irrepressible feminine spirit.

Cast
 Glenn Close as Jan / Maxie
 Mandy Patinkin as	Nick
 Ruth Gordon as Mrs. Lavin
 Barnard Hughes as Bishop Campbell
 Valerie Curtin as Miss Sheffer
 Googy Gress as Father Jerome
 Michael Ensign as Cleopatra Director
 Lou Cutell as Art Isenberg
 Michael Laskin as Commercial Director
 Nelson Welch as Bartender
 Leeza Gibbons as E.T. Reporter

Production
The surviving film clip of Maxie is that of Carole Lombard from The Campus Vamp (1928). The ending of the film differs from the novel where the audition was of a nude scene; the film changes this to a scene similar to one in Cleopatra (1963) where Jan wears a metal snake brassiere in homage to Theda Bara in the 1917 version of the film.

Awards
Academy of Science Fiction, Fantasy & Horror Films, USA
 1986, Glenn Close was nominated for the Golden Globe Award for Best Actress
 1986, Ruth Gordon was nominated for the Saturn Award for Best Supporting Actress
Brussels International Fantastic Film Festival
 1986, Paul Aaron won the Silver Raven
Fantasporto
 1987, Maxie was nominated for the Best Film Award International Fantasy Film Award for Best Film

Critical response  
Critic Roger Ebert, in a review dated September 27, 1985, wrote, "...if Maxie had any brains, she would appear in Jan's body, take one look at the script, and decide she was better off dead."

See also
 List of ghost films

References

External links
 
 
 
 

1985 films
1980s fantasy comedy films
1985 romantic comedy films
1980s romantic fantasy films
1980s ghost films
1985 independent films
American fantasy comedy films
American romantic comedy films
American romantic fantasy films
American ghost films
American independent films
Films about actors
Films about spirit possession
Films about time travel
Films based on works by Jack Finney
Films scored by Georges Delerue
Films set in 1985
Films set in San Francisco
Films shot in California
Aurora Productions films
Orion Pictures films
Films with screenplays by Patricia Resnick
Films directed by Paul Aaron
1980s English-language films
1980s American films